Hernando Siles may refer to:

 Hernando Siles Reyes (1882–1942), Bolivian politician
 Hernando Siles Province, Bolivia
 Estadio Hernando Siles, Bolivian sports stadium